Ulrike Sarvari (born 22 June 1964 in Heidelberg) is a retired German sprinter.

Sarvari finished fifth in the 4 x 100 metres relay for West Germany at the 1987 World Championships in Athletics and fourth in the 1988 Summer Olympics in Seoul. She finished sixth in the 60 metre race at the 1989 IAAF World Indoor Championships.

Sarvari's greatest success came at the 1990 European Indoor Championships in Glasgow, where she won both the 60 m and the 200 m. Sarvari is the only woman to achieve this double in the history of the European Indoor Championships.

At the 1990 European Championships in Athletics in Split, Sarvari was seventh in the 100 metres and won a silver medal in the 4 × 100 m relay for West Germany, together with Gabi Lippe, Andrea Thomas and Silke Knoll.

Achievements

References

1964 births
Living people
West German female sprinters
Athletes (track and field) at the 1988 Summer Olympics
Olympic athletes of West Germany
European Athletics Championships medalists
World Athletics Championships athletes for West Germany
Olympic female sprinters
Sportspeople from Heidelberg
Universiade medalists in athletics (track and field)
Universiade bronze medalists for West Germany